'Basie Swingin' Voices Singin' is a 1966 album by Count Basie with the Alan Copeland singers.

It was issued in UK on His Master's Voice label. The single release "Happiness Is" reached #28 on Billboard's "Easy Listening" survey.

Track listing 
"Happiness Is" (Paul Parnes, Paul Evans)
"I Surrender Dear" (Gordon Clifford, Harry Barris)
"Oh, Lady Be Good!" (George Gershwin, Ira Gershwin)
"You Are My Sunshine" (Jimmie Davis, Charles Mitchell)
"Until I Met You" (Don Wolf, Freddie Green)
"Candy" (Mack David, Joan Whitney Kramer, Alex Kramer)
"Down by the Old Mill Stream" (Tell Taylor)
"Fantastic, That's You" (George Cates, Bob Thiele, Mort Green)
"One for My Baby (and One More for the Road)" (Harold Arlen, Johnny Mercer)
"Girl Talk" (Neal Hefti, Bobby Troup)
"Call Me" (Tony Hatch)

Personnel 
Performance
 The Alan Copeland singers - vocals
 Count Basie - piano
 Roy Eldridge - trumpet
 Al Grey - trombone
 Billy Byers
 Eddie "Lockjaw" Davis - tenor saxophone
 Freddie Green - guitar
 George Duvivier - double bass
 Ed Shaughnessy - drums
Production
Bob Arnold - engineer
Bob Thiele - producer
Teddy Reig

References 

1966 albums
Count Basie albums
Albums produced by Bob Thiele
EMI Records albums
Albums produced by Teddy Reig